Amyloid beta A4 precursor protein-binding family A member 2 is a protein that in humans is encoded by the APBA2 gene.

Structure 

This protein has phosphotyrosine-binding domain (PTB domain or PID) in the middle and two PDZ domains at C-terminal.

Function 

The protein encoded by this gene is a member of the X11 protein family. It is a neuronal adaptor protein that interacts with the Alzheimer's disease amyloid precursor protein (APP). It stabilises APP and inhibits production of proteolytic APP fragments including the A beta peptide that is deposited in the brains of Alzheimer's disease patients. This gene product is believed to be involved in signal transduction processes. It is also regarded as a putative vesicular trafficking protein in the brain that can form a complex with the potential to couple synaptic vesicle exocytosis to neuronal cell adhesion.

Interactions 

APBA2 has been shown to interact with CLSTN1, RELA and amyloid precursor protein.

References

External links

Further reading